Cindy Hook is a global businesswoman who served as the chief executive officer of Deloitte Asia Pacific from September 1, 2018 to May 31, 2022. She was the chief executive officer for Deloitte Australia from 2015 to 2018. Hook was the first female CEO of an Australian big four professional services firm. In 2018 she was named in Australian Financial Review's annual Power issue as one of the top five most powerful people in consulting.

Early life and education
Hook grew up in California, USA and obtained a Bachelor of Science in Business Administration from Miami University.

Career

After graduating from Miami University, Hook began her career at Deloitte in San Francisco. She joined the firm as an auditor in 1986 and was made a partner in 1998.

In 2009, Hook moved to Australia and soon after was appointed the Managing Partner for Deloitte Australia's Assurance and Advisory practice. In 2013, under Hook's leadership, the Deloitte Australia Assurance and Advisory practice won both Accounting Firm of the Year and Audit Firm of the Year in the Australian Financial Review CFO awards – the first time a firm had taken out both awards in the same year.

In February 2015, she was appointed chief executive officer for Deloitte Australia, succeeding the previous CEO Giam Swiegers, With the appointment, she became the first female CEO of an Australian Big Four professional services firm. During her tenure as Deloitte Australia CEO, she led the firm to four consecutive, record years of 15% annual revenue growth.

In September 2018, Hook was elected as the first Deloitte Asia Pacific CEO for a term of four years. In this role Hook oversaw 65,000 professionals and the firm's operations in Australia, China, Japan, Korea, Southeast Asia, and New Zealand.

On 13 December 2022, Hook was appointed as chief executive of the organising committee for the 2032 Summer Olympic and Paralympic Games set to take place in Brisbane, Queensland, Australia.

Activism
Hook is an advocate for diversity, inclusion and well-being. During her time as Deloitte Australia CEO, Hook introduced a Return to Work program to support people that had taken career breaks to transition back to work. She also introduced paid parental leave for fathers and took major steps to enable the advancement of women and ensure pay equality. Hook was named Pride in Diversity CEO of the Year in 2017 for her efforts in creating an inclusive atmosphere at Deloitte and championing the LGBTI community through initiatives such as the Outstanding 50 LGBTI leaders list. In 2016 she was named an Australian Financial Review 100 Women of Influence Awards Finalist.

Other roles
Hook is a member of the board of directors for the Great Barrier Reef Foundation, a special advisor to the Male Champions of Change and a member of Chief Executive Women.

Personal life
Hook is an avid fan of Bruce Springsteen and enjoys travel and the outdoors. She is married with two sons.

References



Australian business executives
Living people
1964 births